Laurel Meadow may refer to:

 Laurel Meadow (Mechanicsville, Virginia), a historic home near Mechanicsville, Hanover County, Virginia
 Laurel Meadow (Richmond, Virginia), a historic house in Richmond, Virginia